The Rolling Stones' American Tour 1981 was a concert tour of stadiums and arenas in the United States to promote the album Tattoo You. It was the largest grossing tour of 1981 with $50 million in ticket sales. Roughly 2,5 million concert goers attended the concerts, setting various ticket sales records. The 5 December show in New Orleans set an indoor concert attendance record which stood for 33 years. 
Total Attendendence for the 1981 and 1982 tour was 3 918 536 People for 82 shows and a Gross revenue of 61 553 007 USD. Attendance in general for each concert was 47 784 people. Total gross per concert was 750 646 US. ( Source : Touringdata.worldpress.com)

History
Initially, singer Mick Jagger was not interested in another tour, but guitarists Keith Richards and Ronnie Wood were, as were elements of the press and public. Jagger eventually relented.
As with previous tours, the American Tour 1981 was promoted by Bill Graham.

The band rehearsed at Long View Farm, North Brookfield, Massachusetts, from 14 August to 25 September 1981. and played a warm-up show at the Sir Morgan's Cove club in Worcester, Massachusetts on 14 September. Although they were billed as Little Boy Blue & The Cockroaches, word got out and some 11,000 fans pushed and shoved outside the 300-capacity venue.  The Mayor of Boston Kevin H. White stopped the notion of further public rehearsals, saying, "The appearance here of Mr. Jagger is not necessarily in the public interest."

The tour's elaborate and colorful stage was the work of Japanese designer Kazuhide Yamazaki. "Most concerts that took place outdoors at the time were played during the day," recalled Jagger, "probably because it was cheaper, I don't know. So we had the bright, bright primary colors... and we had these enormous images of a guitar, a car and a record—an Americana idea—which worked very well for afternoon shows."

Most shows later in the tour featured a cherry picker and the release of hundreds of balloons at the show's end. During the Los Angeles Memorial Coliseum stops on the tour, the band played a Friday and Sunday show and USC had a football game in between on Saturday. As a televised football game, viewers could see the full stage set-up and often field goals would land on stage at the East end zone. Two of the three opening bands, George Thorogood, and The J Geils Band, were received well, but the third – a still somewhat unknown Prince – barely got through three songs before being booed off.

The tour was the largest-grossing tour of 1981, and for several years to come. It grossed $50 million in ticket sales when the average ticket price was $16. Roughly 2,5 million attended the concerts. The Stones set many records that remain unbroken. The JFK Stadium shows in Philadelphia prompted nearly 4 million requests via post cards for tickets (a method used at the time to prevent scalping); requests for the five arena shows in the New York metropolitan area were in the millions.  The New York Times stated, "The tour is expected to be the most profitable in the history of rock & roll; its sheer size has been staggering...ticket requests for these shows ran into the millions..."  The tour indeed did turn out to be profitable: the Stones were estimated to have reaped about $22 million after expenses.

The tour also was an early milestone for the rock industry by selling advertising rights to Jōvan Musk.  Jōvan paid $1 million to put their name on Stones tickets.  This attracted considerable attention in the business media, as Jōvan's image of a pleasant fragrance was at odds with the Stones' bad boys image. But the Stones behaved well on tour, and rock tour corporate sponsorships soon became the norm.

In another marketing first, the 18 December performance at Virginia's Hampton Coliseum on Keith Richards' 38th birthday, was broadcast as "The World's Greatest Rock'n'Roll Party", on pay-per-view and in closed circuit cinemas. It was the first such use of pay-per-view for a music event. When a fan ran onstage during the show, Keith Richards hit him with his guitar.

Also of note was the 14 December performance at Kansas City's Kemper Arena. Former Stones guitarist Mick Taylor joined the band for a large part of the performance. Ronnie Wood was not happy with Taylor, however: "[He was] bulldozing through parts of songs that should have been subtle, ignoring breaks and taking uninvited solos." Other guests during the tour were Tina Turner (who would sing "Honky Tonk Women"), Chuck Leavell, Tower of Power and Sugar Blue. Turner, People reported, had toured with the Stones in 1966 and 1969, and Jagger admitted he had "learned a lot of things" from her.

The 1 October performance at the Rockford MetroCentre in Rockford, Illinois was added to the tour as a result of a petition drive by local radio station WZOK, which attracted more than 35,000 signatures.

In general, there was less backstage madness on the tour than on many previous outings. This was largely due to Richards having largely overcome his well-known drugs and alcohol problems; The New York Times wrote of Richards, "He looks healthy, he is playing brilliantly and his backup vocals are often so lusty that they drown out Mr. Jagger, who is working harder to hold up his end of things as result." However, this and the 1982 tour were the last tours on which Richards contributed the majority of backup vocals; for future tours, additional singers were enlisted.

Several of the concerts were recorded and selected songs were released on 1982's live Still Life.  The Hal Ashby-directed concert film Let's Spend the Night Together grossed $50 million. Possibly due to the film, most of the shows on this tour were professionally recorded. Bootleg evidence suggests that for 35 of the regular 50 shows from this tour, more than half of each concert is directly from the soundboard.

This was the Stones' last tour of the United States until 1989.

Personnel

The Rolling Stones
Mick Jagger – lead vocals, guitar
Keith Richards – guitar, vocals
Ronnie Wood – guitar, backing vocals
Bill Wyman – bass
Charlie Watts – drums

Additional musicians
Lee Allen – saxophone (1 October, Rockford, Illinois, and on 3 and 4 October at Folsom Field, in Boulder, Colorado)
Ian Stewart – piano
Ian McLagan – keyboards, backing vocals
Ernie Watts – saxophone (7 October, San Diego, CA through last show of US tour, 19 December 1981, Hampton Roads Coliseum, Hampton, VA)
Bobby Keys – saxophone (on 'Let it Bleed', 'Brown Sugar', 'Tumbling Dice' and 'Honky Tonk Women', from 9 October, Los Angeles, CA through last show of US tour, 19 December 1981, Hampton Roads Coliseum, Hampton, VA)

Set list
The usual set list was:

 "Under My Thumb"
 "When the Whip Comes Down"
 "Let's Spend the Night Together"
 "Shattered"
 "Neighbours"
 "Black Limousine"
 "Just My Imagination (Running Away with Me)"
"Down The Road Apiece" (played 26–27 September; 3, 5 & 9 November)
"Mona" (played only 26 September)
 "Twenty-Flight Rock"
 "Going to a Go-Go" (first played in Louisville, Kentucky, 3 November)
 "Let Me Go"
 "Time Is on My Side"
 "Beast of Burden"
 "Waiting on a Friend"
 "Let It Bleed"
 "Tops" (Played 25 & 27 September, 3 October)
 "You Can't Always Get What You Want"
 "Little T&A"
 "Tumbling Dice"
 "She's So Cold"
 "All Down The Line" (Played 18 Times)
 "Hang Fire"
 "Star Star" (Played 10 Times)
 "Miss You"
 "Honky Tonk Women"
 "Brown Sugar"
 "Start Me Up"
 "Jumpin' Jack Flash"
 "Street Fighting Man" (played from 25 September-9 October and 26 October) [encore]
 "(I Can't Get No) Satisfaction" (played 25 September; 3 & 11 October until end of tour) [encore]
 "Outro The Star-Spangled Banner (version Jimi Hendrix in Woodstock 1969)" [encore]

For the first dozen or so shows most of the set list was moved around to find the most comfortable feel for the concerts.

Worcester show

The set list for the 14 September 1981 show is unverified, but is reported to include:

 "Everybody Needs Somebody to Love"
 "Mona (I Need You Baby)"
 "Under My Thumb"
 "Down the Road Apiece"
 "Let It Bleed"
"I Just Want To Make Love To You"
 "She's So Cold"
 "Hang Fire"
 "All Down The Line"
 "Honky Tonk Women"
 "Start Me Up"
 "Jumpin' Jack Flash"
 "(I Can't Get No) Satisfaction"
 "Outro: The Star-Spangled Banner (tape)"

Irregular songs
Beyond the first five shows "Tops" and "Mona" were not played (though neither were ever played on the same night, they did not occupy the same location in the set list). Up until the shows in New Jersey "Down the Road Apiece" and "Street Fighting Man" both made a few appearances. "Star Star" was added into the set for every gig in between and including Boulder and both Orlando shows (with the sole exception of the second show in Boulder). "All Down the Line" was played 18 times in the first 24 regular gigs. The six exclusions were the first 4 regular shows and the 2 first shows in November.

The 21 November concert in St. Paul, MN was memorable because Jesse Ventura, who worked as a body guard on the Tour of the Americas '75, did the introduction, as he had on their 1978 North American tour.

Tour dates

See also
Hampton Coliseum (Live 1981)
Let's Spend the Night Together

References

1981 concert tours
1981 in American music
Concert tours of the United States
The Rolling Stones concert tours